Simon of Cascia (or Simeone Fidati) (c. 1295–1348) was an ascetic and preacher from Cascia, Italy.  In his early days, he was influenced by the Spiritual Franciscan Angelo Clareno da Cingoli. He is commemorated on February 16.

Life and career
Simon was born in Cascia, Italy, around 1295, of the distinguished Fidati family. His initial studies were in the natural sciences, which he later gave up for theology and scripture. He entered the Order of Augustinian Hermits at about the age of twenty. He began his preaching ministry in 1318, and was renowned as a brilliant preacher in places such as Perugia, Bologna, Siena, and Florence. His model of austerity and strict penances brought him more followers. He was a gifted spiritual advisor and confessor and, spent many nights writing letters to those seeking his guidance. 

His desire for a spiritual life of study, prayer and solitude caused him to reject all episcopal appointments. He often sought council from the Benedictine Camaldolese monk, Bl Silvester of Valdiseve. 

He wrote in both Latin and vernacular Italian. The origin and influence of his writings have sparked some debate among scholars, both literary and theological. His most significant writing, The Works of Our Savior (De Gestis Domini Salvatoris), was read widely during the Middle Ages, and is believed to have influenced the 16th century reformer Martin Luther. 

He also worked to reform those involved in prostitution, converting many and founding a "house of penance" for them.   In Florence, he founded a woman's convent, and a refuge for unmarried mothers.  

Simon died in Florence on February 2, 1348, during the Great Plague. His remains are preserved in Cascia at the Basilica of St. Rita. He was beatified by Pope Gregory XVI in 1833.

Works

Published
De gestis Christis
Expositio super evangelia
De beata Virgine

Unpublished
De cognitione peccati
Expositio symboli
De speculo crucis
De conflictu christiano
De vita christiana
De doctrina christiana

References

External links

Blessed Simon Fidati of Cascia

1348 deaths
Augustinian friars
Italian beatified people
14th-century venerated Christians
Year of birth unknown
Venerated Catholics
Beatifications by Pope Gregory XVI